Park Suk-ja (born 27 April 1970) is a South Korean athlete. She competed in the women's long jump at the 1988 Summer Olympics.

References

1970 births
Living people
Athletes (track and field) at the 1988 Summer Olympics
South Korean female long jumpers
Olympic athletes of South Korea
Place of birth missing (living people)